According to the Book of Mormon, Omni is the first writer of several authors of the Book of Omni, and the son of Jarom.  It is believed that he was born in 390 BC.  Omni wrote the first three verses of the Book of Omni before passing the responsibility of keeping the Book of Mormon record to his son, Amaron.  His writings are shown below:

Family

Possible origin of the name 
Hugh Nibley relates the name to the Egyptian deity Amon, and states:

"[His] name is very obvious. It means 'belonging to Amon'. Remember Amon is the name in the Book of Mormon. There are more Ammon names and Amon compounds than anything else, because actually in the time of Lehi, Amon was the god of the empire. It was the one time when God filled the Earth. Amon filled the Earth with the Egyptian Empire. They claimed everything, but always in the name of Amon.... [Amon] means 'the one who is not known, the secret one whom we can't name, whose name is not known to us.' but Omni means 'he who belongs to Amon.'"

This element can be found in the name of the 7th century Jewish king Amon.

Omni is also similar to the Biblical name "Omri" (Hebrew: עמרי); fl. 9th century BC) who was the sixth king of Israel.

References

Book of Mormon people